Kregel Publications is an Evangelical Christian book publisher based in Grand Rapids, Michigan. It has three subdivisions: Kregel Publications, Editorial Portavoz and Kregel Parable Bookstore.

History
The company was founded in 1909, by Louis Kregel as 'Kregel Books'. The company initially sold Dutch language Christian books generally imported from Holland. Soon after the son, Robert Kregel (aged 20) took over the firm in 1949 the company changes its name to 'Kregel Publications' and started publishing classic reprints.

This company is the oldest of four Dutch founded Christian publishing houses, the other three being William B. Eerdmans Publishing (in 1911), Zondervan Publishing (in 1931) and Baker Book House (in 1939) all founded and based in the Grand Rapids area.

Subdivisions

Kregel Publications
Kregel Publications is a publisher of Christian fiction, nonfiction and children's books. In addition to its own titles the division represents Lion Hudson of Great Britain in North American market. As such it exclusively distributes Monarch Books, Lion Fiction and Candle Books and the religious market distributor for Lion Books and Lion Children's Books.

Editorial Portavoz
The Editorial Portavoz publishing business responded to the influx of Latin Americans into the US. The company responded to their needs and opened this Spanish language division for the publication of Spanish language Christian books.

Kregel Parable Bookstore
Kregel Parable Bookstore continues the initial company's book retailing tradition, serving the Grand Rapids area.

References

External links
Kregel Publications

Book publishing companies based in Michigan
Christian mass media companies
Christian publishing companies
Companies based in Grand Rapids, Michigan
Religion in Grand Rapids, Michigan
Protestantism in Michigan
Publishing companies established in 1949
1909 establishments in Michigan